Haisborough Sands (or Haisboro Sands or Haisbro Sands) is a sandbank off the coast of Norfolk, England at Happisburgh. The shoal is marked to the north-west by north by the Haisbro Light Buoy, North cardinal. To the south-east by south is a light buoy South cardinal, and to the west by Mid Haisbro light buoy starboard hand. In 1995 there were three drying patches recorded to the north-north east and east-south east of the Mid Haisbro light buoy. Except at slack water their positions are indicated by tidal eddies particularly on the north west, and in slight or moderate seas the swell breaks on the shallower parts of the banks. There are several foul patches on the southern part of the shoal. Over the years this shoal has claimed many ships.

Description
The main ridge of the shoal is made up of five distinct areas. These are named Haisborough Sand, Haisborough Tail, Hammond Knoll, Winterton Ridge and Hearty Knoll. To the eastern edge of the sands there are areas called Hewett Ridge and Smiths Knoll which form a ridge of sandbanks on the outer boundary of the sands. Inshore and to the west there are additional banks including Winterton Shoal and the Newarp Banks.

Fish and mammals
Haisborough Sands and its surrounding shoals are known to be spawning grounds for Sand eels Ammodytes, Lemon sole Microstormus Kitt and sole Solea solea. The sands also provide nursery grounds for Cod Gadus morhua, Herring Clupea harengus, Mackerel Scomber scombrus, Sole, Lemon sole and Plaice Pleuronectes platessa. There are small numbers of Harbour porpoise regularly observed within the boundaries of the sands. The common seals Phoca vitulina which are resident in the Wash are occasionally observed in this area.

Ships wrecked on Haisborough Sands
Some of the ships wrecked here include:

HMS Bideford New Years Eve 1761/2
HMS Invincible - 16 March 1801
SS Chicago - 1878
Barque Brownrigg on 12 August 1888
SS Cambria after a collision with SS Killingworth on 14 May 1891
Barque Ceylon of Christiania, Norway, 1893
Optima ex Placilla - 18 January 1905
SS Atbara of London on 11 February 1907
An un-named steamer - 1907
 Barque Alf of Laurvig, Norway on 23 November 1909
SS Bodil of Esbjerg on 26 May 1915
SS Camille on 6 January 1916
SS Kronprindsesse Victoria of Haugesund, Norway. 26. November 1917
SS Georgia - 1927
SS Monte Nevoso during 14–16 October 1932
SS Meriones 26 January 1941
SS Gallois; part of Convoy FS 559 on 6 August 1941
SS Oxshott of London; part of Convoy FS 559 on 6 August 1941
SS Aberhill of Methil, Fife; part of Convoy FS 559 on 6 August 1941
SS Taara of Pärnu, Estonia; part of Convoy FS 559 on 6 August 1941
SS Paddy Hendly on her maiden voyage; part of Convoy FS 559 on 6 August 1941
SS Deerwood of London; part of Convoy FS 559 on 6 August 1941
SS Betty Hindley; part of Convoy FS 559 on 6 August 1941
SS Afon Towy on 6 August 1941
HM Trawler Agate (referred to as T87 by the Admiralty); part of Convoy FS 559 on the 6 August 1941
Trawler MV Cuttlefish - 1981
City of Sunderland - 2008
Muros - 3 December 2016

Gallery

See also
Happisburgh Lifeboat Station
Hammond's Knoll - nearby sandbank, similarly treacherous
Scroby Sands

References

Sandbanks of the North Sea
Coastal features of Norfolk
Landforms of Norfolk
Sandbanks of England